Albaida del Aljarafe is a municipality in Seville. It had a population of approximately 3,084 people in 2013, up from 2,231 in 2005. It has architecture from the Roman and pre-Roman eras. Much of its industry is agricultural, with the main crop being olives.

Member of the European Parliament Soledad Cabezón Ruiz was mayor of the municipality from 2003–2011.

References 

Municipalities of the Province of Seville